To Seek a Newer World is a 1967 book written by Robert F. Kennedy, in which he outlines his analysis on issues such as the war in Vietnam, nuclear power, welfare, and other issues. In response to the publication, New York Times critic Eliot Fremont-Smith stated, "To Seek a Newer World is addressed essentially-and in this reviewer's opinion, thoughtfully and constructively-to the double crisis of conscience and confidence which may be the common root of most of the major issues that now confront us". The book also was praised by the Christian Science Monitor.

References

1967 non-fiction books
Works by Robert F. Kennedy
American non-fiction books